Gerald Kyd (born Gerasimos Avvakoumides in 1973 in Pretoria, South Africa) is a half-Greek, half-Scottish actor. Kyd starred as Sean Maddox in the BBC medical drama Casualty from 1998 until 2000. He later reprised the role for a few episodes in 2006.

Filmography

Films

Television

Theatre credits
 The Seagull - Boris Trigorin Royal Shakespeare Company
 Cyrano De Bergerac - Chevalier D'Antignac-Juzet
 The Prophet in Exile - Khalil Gibran
 The Pit and the Pendulum - William
 Loves Labours Lost - King Ferdinand-ETT
 Deathtrap - Clifford Anderson
 The Local Stigmatic  - David- Lyric Hammersmith
 The Ramayana - Rama- Birmingham
 Richard II - Henry Hotspur Percy - Globe Theatre
 Edward II - Gaveston - Globe
 Revelations - Tony - Hampstead
 Conversations in Havana - Che
 The Three Musketeers - Athos- Bristol Old Vic
 Blood and Gifts - Colonel Afridi - Royal National Theatre (2010).
 The Real Thing - Henry (West Yorkshire Playhouse & UK Tour (2012)
 55 Days - John Lilburne - Hampstead Theatre (2012)
 Richard III - Catesby - Trafalgar Studios (2014)
 Feed the Beast - Michael (Birmingham Rep) (2015)
 Hapgood - Ridley (Hampstead Theatre) (2015)

References

External links

Living people
1973 births
Scottish male film actors
Scottish male stage actors
Scottish male television actors
Scottish people of Greek descent
South African people of Greek descent
South African emigrants to the United Kingdom
People from Pretoria